The Australian Scout Jamboree is a jamboree which is held every three years by Scouts Australia. The Jamboree is traditionally held in early January and typically runs for ten nights.

The first, in 1934, was held in Frankston, Victoria, and was attended by the World Chief Scout, Robert Baden-Powell. The Frankston district still uses the original Jamboree logo as its district emblem. Jamborees have been held regularly since 1934, except for 1942 and 1945, due to World War 2, and in 2022, due to the COVID-19 pandemic.

Rotation 
Traditionally Australian Jamborees are hosted on a rotational basis, with the order of hosting being as follows:
South Australia
Victoria
Western Australia
Queensland
New South Wales

Each Scouting Branch (State) is the effective host of the Australian Jamboree and takes responsibility for its management.

By world standards, Australian Jamborees are medium-sized, with the largest Jamborees being held in Europe and North America and generally hosting between 35,000 and 40,000 participants.

List

 

Jamborees were not held during World War II or during the COVID-19 pandemic (AJ2022 was cancelled on 23 January 2021)

Organisational structure

Committee
The Jamboree Organising Committee (JOC) has the primary task of organising and running the Jamboree. The host state takes the responsibility for forming a JOC from local Scouters.

Contingents
The largest organisational unit of the Jamboree is a Contingent. There is one contingent for each of the Australian States and Territories - Australian Capital Territory, New South Wales, Northern Territory, Queensland, South Australia, Tasmania, Victoria, Western Australia, - as well as New Zealand, Guides Australia, and International Contingents.

A troop consists of about 36 Scouts, six patrols of youth members and six to seven leaders. Each troop shares a common camping area where they will cook, sleep and socialise for the duration of the Jamboree. Troops are generally made up of members of the same contingent and Mixed Overseas contingent.

Youth members in troops are further subdivided into patrols of five or six Scouts. The most experienced Scout is generally given the task of being 'Patrol Leader' or 'PL', and another experienced Scout is assigned as 'Assistant Patrol Leader' or 'APL'. Scouts work in patrols for all activities and tasks during the Jamboree. At the jamboree Patrol Leaders are given special prizes and a special lunch to acknowledge the important task they carry out.

Scouts must be between the age of 10 and 14 and must have proven their Scouting skills by earning their Pioneer Badge. Participants will be expected to cook for themselves, keep their sleeping area and campsite clean and tidy, participate in their assigned activities, and cope with the experience of being away from home for the period of the Jamboree (usually about 11 days).

Other participants
Older members, namely Venturers and Rovers, also attend the Jamboree to assist with activities and other tasks. Younger members, including Joeys and Cubs, and families and friends of Scouting are able to visit the site as day visitors, especially on Future Scout Day (Market Day), where games and stalls are set up by the Scouts attending the Jamboree.

Activities
Jamboree activities are a mixture of on-site and off-site activities that seek to challenge the participants, reinforce Scouting values, provide valuable and new experiences, and most of all, be great fun.

Activities for the 2007 Australian Scout Jamboree included:

Circus Skills
Bush tracking and navigation
Flying - the AJ2007 site had its own airstrip
Canoes, rafts and swimming at Lake Nagambie
Exploring Historic Echuca
Visiting Bendigo
Plenty of mud activities

Activities for the 2019 Australian Scout Jamboree included:
The Smash Zone - an activity in which nine Scout's were given two minutes to smash three cars
Ice Skating
A camp inside a camp at Woodhouse, the site of the 2004 Australian Jamboree. Activities such as pioneering, high ropes and low ropes, archery tag, orienteering, an arcade room and an obstacle course were included
BMX Biking
Mud pits 
Abseiling and rock climbing
Mountain biking
A day exploring in Adelaide
Land sailing
Shooting
Flying - like the 2007 Jamboree, AJ2019 had an airstrip on site
Skateboarding
Raft building, canoeing, swimming, rowing and sailing at Wellington Marina
Drone flying
Crate stacking

On site
During a Jamboree there could be more people on the Jamboree site than there are in some regional towns. Considerable resources and infrastructure are set up at the Jamboree sites to ensure the safety, well-being and enjoyment of all participants. Some of the Jamboree resources include:

Main and secondary stage areas
Shopping Mall
Socialisation Areas
Hospital and First Aid posts
Internet Café
On-site radio station, to which both Scouts and leaders contribute
On-site newspaper
Transport Depot
Police and security
Temporary on-site fire station
Banking facilities including ATMs
Warehousing of food and consumables
Reliable communications infrastructure
Fresh water supply and grey water processing

21st Australian Jamboree

The 21st Australian Jamboree (AJ2007) took place at the Elmore Field Days site in Elmore, Victoria, from 1 to 13 January, 2007. It was the first major Scout event in 2007 and thus the first to celebrate 100 years of Scouting. 12,000 adults and youth from Australia and 30 other counties attended the Jamboree, 8,500 of whom were Scouts. The Jamboree had a theme of "Get in the Game" to promote participation.

Activities
AJ2007 featured four off-site activities: Wet Wild & Windy, Riverforce, Bushwacked and Ready Set Bendigo.

On-site activities included Venture Extreme (learning about linking to Ventures), X-Site (circus themed), Planet Blitz (focused on recycling and the environment), Rock Sports (rock climbing and abseiling) and Sky High (joy flights over the Jamboree site Elmore, and Rochester). Game On was another activity featuring six bases. It included sports, car smashing, mud and a giant water slide.

Additional on-site activities included a carnival, contingent HQ, subcamp activities and a mall.

An amateur radio station was also set up at the Jamboree by the Scout Radio and Electronics Service Unit (Vic), utilising the special event call sign VI3JAM.  A notable achievement of the station was a live link to the International Space Station when Scouts had to opportunity to talk with Astronaut LCDR Sunita Williams in orbit of the earth.

Entertainment
The Australian Jamboree 2007 featured much entertainment, with music acts such as Evermore, The Rogue Traders, Björn Again, Tripod and Taxiride performing on the main arena; along with numerous cover bands. Stunt planes and Motocross riders brought other nights alive; along with a Marquee called “The Place” which had themed discos.

Cleanup
Cleanup of the site involved removing 200 tonnes of rubbish, dismantling 16,000 square meters of marquee, and removing 208 portable buildings on site, including toilets. It was expected to take a fortnight using 50 volunteers. The Scouts had already taken down their own tents and troop facilities.

References

External links
The first Australian Jamboree
AJ2013 website
Scouts Australia website, with information on the next Jamborees.
Victorian Jamborees' daily newspapers digitised on Trove
The 25th Australian Jamboree (AJ2019) website

Scouting jamborees
Jamboree, Australian Scout